Marianela Virginia Vivas Perea (born 11 January 1978) is an Ecuadorian retired footballer who played as a forward. She has been a member of the Ecuador women's national team.

International career
Vivas played for Ecuador at senior level in two South American Women's Football Championship editions (2003 and 2006).

International goals
Scores and results list Ecuador's goal tally first

References

1978 births
Living people
Women's association football forwards
Ecuadorian women's footballers
Sportspeople from Esmeraldas, Ecuador
Ecuador women's international footballers
21st-century Ecuadorian women